Cylindrocladium is a genus of ascomycete fungi in the family Nectriaceae. Many species within this genus are synonymous with the genus Calonectria.

Species
Cylindrocladium bambusae
Cylindrocladium buxicola
Cylindrocladium clavatum
Cylindrocladium colombiense
Cylindrocladium couratarii
Cylindrocladium ellipticum
Cylindrocladium heptaseptatum
Cylindrocladium infestans
Cylindrocladium intermedium
Cylindrocladium lanceolatum
Cylindrocladium macrosporum
Cylindrocladium musae
Cylindrocladium perseae
Cylindrocladium peruvianum
Cylindrocladium terrestre

References

External links 
 

Nectriaceae genera